Meherpur Government High School is situated in Meherpur, Bangladesh. It was established in 1854, since the British regime in Indian sub-continent. Before the partition of India in 1947, the school was inclusive to a village of Nadia District, named Kathuli. After the plotting of Radcliffe Line, the school was almost to the frontier line of East Bengal. Later, the school was shifted to the present place in 1960 due to the reason, naming Meherpur Multilateral Model High School. After 8 years of the relocation, on 15 November 1968, the school eventually named as Meherpur Govt. High School.

Administration

Teachers
Currently, 20 teachers have been appointed to proceed the academic curriculum of the school.

PTA Committee
The PTA committee is formulated to build up the relationship between teachers and guardians for the betterment of the school and the academic procedure.

Accountability
The school is accountable to the district commissioner's office, directly to the assistant commissioner (education) of the Meherpur district.

Curriculum
It is a typical government operated high school where students are usually admitted in class 3 or class 6 and ends after passing the SSC examination or the secondary school certificate, which is a public examination in Bangladesh. Before passing SSC, the students have to sit for another exam called JSC or junior school certificate.

Passing JSC exam, students choose their concentrations from science, commerce or arts. After passing SSC examination from one of these concentrations, the students finish their high school life and move on for higher secondary schools, or also known as college.

Facilities
Being a government school, the school provides multifarious facility which are following:

 Physics Lab
 Biology Lab
 Chemistry Lab
 Computer Lab
 Library
 Common Room
 Bicycle Stand
 Play Ground

Scholarship
Merit based government provided scholarships are available here.

References

High schools in Bangladesh
1854 establishments in India
Educational institutions established in 1854